is a district located in Wakayama Prefecture, Japan.

As of September 1, 2008, the district has an estimated population of 50,095 and a density of 114 persons/km2. The total area is 437.88 km2.

Towns and villages
Aridagawa
Hirogawa
Yuasa

Neighbouring Regions 

 Yoshino district, Nara Prefecture, Japan
 Arida City, Wakayama Prefecture, Japan
 Hidaka District, Wakayama Prefecture, Japan
 Tanabe City, Wakayama Prefecture, Japan
 Ito District, Wakayama Prefecture, Japan
 Kainan City, Wakayama Prefecture, Japan
 Kaisō District, Wakayama Prefecture, Japan

Merger 
On January 1, 2006 - the towns of Kanaya, Kibi and Shimizu merged to form the new town of Aridagawa.

Districts in Wakayama Prefecture